Elena  is a Mexican telenovela produced by Televisa and transmitted by Telesistema Mexicano.

Silvia Derbez and Carlos López Moctezuma starred as protagonists.

Cast 
Silvia Derbez
Carlos López Moctezuma
Roberto Cañedo
Carlos Navarro
Dalia Iñiguez
Miguel Arenas
Fedora Capdevila
Dolores Tinoco
Humberto Valdepeña

References 

Mexican telenovelas
1961 telenovelas
Televisa telenovelas
1961 Mexican television series debuts
1961 Mexican television series endings
Spanish-language telenovelas